HMS Nubian was a  destroyer of the Royal Navy that saw much distinguished service in World War II. She won 13 battle honours, a record only exceeded by one other ship, and matched by two others.

Description
The Tribals were intended to counter the large destroyers being built abroad and to improve the firepower of the existing destroyer flotillas and were thus significantly larger and more heavily armed than the preceding . The destroyers were powered by two Parsons geared steam turbines, each driving one propeller shaft using steam provided by three Admiralty three-drum boilers. The ships' complement consisted of 190 officers and ratings, although the flotilla leaders carried an extra 20 officers and men consisting of the Captain (D) and his staff.

The primary armament of the Tribal-class destroyers was eight quick-firing (QF) 4.7-inch (120 mm) Mark XII guns in four superfiring twin-gun mounts, one pair each fore and aft of the superstructure, designated 'A', 'B', 'X', and 'Y' from front to rear. The mounts had a maximum elevation of 40°. For anti-aircraft (AA) defence, they carried a single quadruple mount for the  QF two-pounder Mk II "pom-pom" gun and two quadruple mounts for the 0.5-inch (12.7 mm) Mark III machine gun. Low-angle fire for the main guns was controlled by the director-control tower (DCT) on the bridge roof that fed data acquired by it and the  rangefinder on the Mk II Rangefinder/Director directly aft of the DCT to an analogue mechanical computer, the Mk I Admiralty Fire Control Clock. Anti-aircraft fire for the main guns was controlled by the Rangefinder/Director which sent data to the mechanical Fuze Keeping Clock.

The ships were fitted with a single above-water quadruple mount for  torpedoes. The Tribals were not intended as anti-submarine ships, but they were provided with ASDIC, one depth charge rack and two throwers for self-defence, although the throwers were not mounted in all ships; Twenty depth charges was the peacetime allotment, but this increased to 30 during wartime.

Wartime modifications
Heavy losses to German air attack during the Norwegian Campaign  demonstrated the ineffectiveness of the Tribals' anti-aircraft suite and the RN decided in May 1940 to replace 'X' mount with two QF  Mark XVI dual-purpose guns in a twin-gun mount. To better control the guns, the existing rangefinder/director was modified to accept a Type 285 gunnery radar as they became available. The number of depth charges was increased to 46 early in the war, and still more were added later. To increase the firing arcs of the AA guns, the rear funnel was shortened and the mainmast was reduced to a short pole mast.

Construction and career 
Authorized as one of seven Tribal-class destroyers under the 1935 Naval Estimates, Nubian was the third ship of her name to serve in the Royal Navy. The ship was ordered on 10 March 1936 from John I. Thornycroft & Company and was laid down on 10 August at the company's Woolston, Southampton, shipyard. Launched on 21 December 1937, Nubian was completed on 7 December 1938 and commissioned on 1 December at a cost of £339,265 which excluded weapons and communications outfits furnished by the Admiralty. The ship's completion was delayed by the late delivery of her gunsights.

Nubian was in home waters for the early part of the Second World War, and saw action with the Home Fleet during the Norwegian Campaign in May 1940.

The flotilla left Plymouth for Alexandria on 18 May 1940, in company with 4 K-class destroyers from the 5th Destroyer Flotilla en route for service in the Red Sea; they arrived in Alexandria on 25 May, just two weeks days before hostilities with Italy commenced on 11 June 1940.

Nubian saw much action, being involved in the actions at Calabria, in July 1940, Matapan (March 1941), Sfax (April), and finally Crete (May).

During the battle of Crete, on 26 May, Nubian was bombed and had her stern blown off, with the loss of 7 of her crew killed, and another 12 wounded. Despite further attacks, she was able to return to Alexandria under escort, but departed there on 12 June under tow for extensive repairs in Bombay, which were not completed for another 18 months.

Nubian returned to the Mediterranean and the 14th Destroyer Flotilla in November 1942, seeing action with them against the  convoy on 2 December and off Tripoli in company with Jervis on 20–21 December.

In 1943, she was involved with supporting the landings in Sicily, and at Salerno, before returning to Britain for reassignment to the Arctic.  While in the Arctic she conducted convoy escort duty, during which she was involved in at least one direct attack on a U-boat, a cat and mouse hunt which lasted some days. She also tracked at least 11 other U-boats that twice attacked the convoy she was shadowing. During operations conducted in the Arctic, she dispatched back to Norway on two vital operations. These were a strike on the German submarine base at Trondheim Fjord, and a strike on the German battleship  at Alton Fjord.

At the end of 1944, Nubian was refitted, ready to be dispatched to the Far East in March 1945 as part of the escort force of the 21st Aircraft Carrier Squadron, seeing action in support of the closing operations in Burma.

Battle honours

 Norway 1940
 Calabria 1940
 Mediterranean 1940-43
 Libya 1940
 Matapan 1941
 Sfax 1941
 Greece 1941
 Crete 1941
 Malta Convoys 1941
 Sicily 1943
 Salerno 1943
 Arctic 1944
 Norway 1944
 Burma 1944-45

Notes

References
 G.G.Connell : Mediterranean Maelstrom: HMS Jervis and the 14th Flotilla (1987) 
 
 
 
 
 
 
 
 
 
 
 A.E. Weightman : Crests and Badges of H.M. Ships (1957) ISBN (none)

 

Tribal-class destroyers (1936) of the Royal Navy
Ships built in Southampton
1937 ships
World War II destroyers of the United Kingdom